Charles Wharton may refer to:

Charles Wharton (MP), Member of Parliament (MP) for Berwick-upon-Tweed
Charles S. Wharton (1875–1939), U.S. Representative from Illinois
Charles Wharton (American football) (1868–1949), American football player
Charles Kemeys-Tynte, 8th Baron Wharton (1876–1934)
Charles John Halswell Kemys-Tynte, 9th Baron Wharton
Charles Henry Wharton (1748–1833), Episcopal clergyman and president of Columbia University

See also
Charles Warton (1832–1900), politician and businessman